Michele Tafoya (born 1964/1965) is an American sports broadcaster and advisor. From 2011 to 2022, she was a reporter for NBC Sports, primarily as a sideline reporter for NBC Sunday Night Football. She currently works as a political advisor and makes television appearances on talk shows discussing the state of American politics and culture.

Early life
Tafoya is the daughter of Wilma (née Conley) and Orlando Tafoya. She is of Hispanic descent. She has one brother and three sisters. She attended Mira Costa High School in Manhattan Beach, California. She received a Bachelor of Arts degree in mass communications from the University of California, Berkeley in 1988, and a master's degree in business administration from the University of Southern California in 1991.

Career
Tafoya worked as a host and reporter for KFAN-AM in Minneapolis, primarily for Minnesota Vikings and University of Minnesota women's basketball broadcasts. She worked for WAQS (now WFNZ) in Charlotte, where she went by the name Mickey Conley. Conley is her mother's maiden name.

Tafoya also worked for the Midwest Sports Channel, serving as a Minnesota Timberwolves host and sideline reporter, as well as a play-by-play commentator for women's Big Ten basketball and volleyball. Tafoya then spent three years at WCCO-TV in Minneapolis as a sports anchor and reporter.

CBS Sports
Tafoya joined CBS Sports in September 1994 as a reporter and host for the CBS Television Network's sports anthology show CBS Sports Spectacular and college basketball coverage. She served as a host of At The Half and as a reporter for college football games. She made her on-air debut at the 1994 U.S. Open Tennis Championships.

In 1997, The American Women in Radio and Television honored Tafoya with a Gracie Award for "Outstanding Achievement by an Individual On-Air TV Personality" for her play-by-play calling of WNBA games on Lifetime Television. Tafoya served as a reporter for the network's coverage of the NFL, college football—including the 1998 National Championship Orange Bowl—and was late-night co-host with Al Trautwig of the 1998 Winter Olympics in Nagano. In addition to her diverse assignments, Tafoya hosted CBS's NCAA Tournament selection show, Goodwill Games and the U.S Open Tennis Championships coverage. She left CBS at the end of 1999, after five years with the network.

ABC Sports and ESPN
Tafoya joined ESPN and ABC Sports in January 2000, working as a sideline reporter for ABC Sports' Monday Night Football during the 2004 NFL season and the 2005 NFL season before the program shifted to ESPN; she worked the sideline for ESPN Monday Night Football beginning in 2006. Tafoya was a co-host for the Mike Tirico Show on ESPN radio. She helped ABC in its coverage of Super Bowl XL in Detroit as a sideline reporter with Suzy Kolber.

She was loaned to NBC Sports for the 2000 Sydney Olympics as a Reporter for Rhythmic Gymnastics and as the play-by-play woman for softball.

On October 10, 2003, Tafoya poured beer over two fans beneath her luxury box at the Metrodome during a University of Minnesota versus University of Michigan game. Tafoya admitted to losing her composure and said she was embarrassed over the incident. She also issued a public apology.

Tafoya formerly worked at NBA games on ABC and ESPN. On October 21, 2008, she announced she would be resigning from her duties as head NBA sideline reporter.

Tafoya's other previous roles included a stint as the men's and women's NCAA basketball play-by-play and studio host and as a college football and basketball sideline reporter. She also has served as a substitute host on Pardon the Interruption and as a panelist on The Sports Reporters II. Her other ESPN assignments have included calling WNBA games as well as hosting skiing telecasts and working on ESPN's college basketball selection shows as a reporter. She also was a correspondent for SportsCenter and Outside the Lines.

In 2006, the Davie-Brown Index ranked Tafoya among the most likable TV sports personalities, including Biggest Trend-Setter. At the end of the 2010-2011 NFL season, she left ESPN for NBC Sports.

Return to WCCO
Tafoya was announced as the new evening drive time talk radio host for WCCO-AM on April 19, 2009. Her show began on June 1, 2009, where she teamed with afternoon host and lead-in Don Shelby on the schedule from 3-3:30 p.m., with Tafoya taking over from 3:30-6 p.m.  Her hosting ended on Friday, January 27, 2012. She made the decision ahead of her schedule becoming busier with the Super Bowl and London Olympics.

KQRS Radio
Tafoya joined "The KQ Morning Show" on KQRS-FM as co-host with long-time KQ morning personality Tom Barnard on September 8, 2016. She left the KQRS morning show in March 2020. The team dynamics were well received.

NBC Sports

On May 4, 2011, Tafoya was announced as the new sideline reporter for NBC Sunday Night Football, replacing Andrea Kremer and rejoining former co-worker and announcer Al Michaels.  Tafoya has also covered swimming during the Summer Olympics for NBC.

Andrew Marchand of the New York Post reported that Tafoya would leave Sunday Night Football following the 2021 season.  On January 11, 2022, NBC confirmed in a press release that Tafoya would depart the network, with Super Bowl LVI as her final assignment, to pursue other opportunities.

Politics 
On February 14, 2022, a day after her departure from NBC Sports, Republican Minnesota gubernatorial candidate Kendall Qualls announced Tafoya would be joining his campaign as co-chair.

Personal life
Tafoya had three pregnancies of four children end in miscarriage before carrying her son to term. She and her husband, Mark Vandersall, have a natural son and an adopted daughter. The family lives in Edina, Minnesota. In 2007, she told WCCO-TV that she had been struggling with an eating disorder since she was a child.

Tafoya describes herself as a "pro-choice conservative with libertarian leanings".

Career timeline
1998: Winter Olympics Late-Night Host
 1994–1997 & 1999 NCAA on CBS Sideline Reporter
1998: NFL on CBS Sideline Reporter
1999: SEC on CBS Sideline Reporter 
2000–2003: ESPN College Football sideline reporter
2002–2003: Monday Night Countdown reporter
2004–2010: Monday Night Football Sideline Reporter
2002–2008: NBA on ABC and NBA on ESPN Sideline Reporter
2009–2012: WCCO Radio Afternoon Drive Host
2011–2021: NBC Sunday Night Football Sideline Reporter
2016–2020: KQRS Morning Show Co-host
2022–present: Left NBC to become a freelance reporter

References

External links

Living people
People from Minneapolis
People from Greater Los Angeles
Marshall School of Business alumni
University of California, Berkeley alumni
American radio sports announcers
American television reporters and correspondents
American talk radio hosts
American television sports announcers
American libertarians
American women television journalists
College basketball announcers in the United States
College football announcers
Radio personalities from Minneapolis
National Football League announcers
National Basketball Association broadcasters
Olympic Games broadcasters
American women radio presenters
Women sports announcers
Women's college basketball announcers in the United States
Women's National Basketball Association announcers
Tennis commentators
Volleyball commentators
20th-century American women
21st-century American women
Year of birth missing (living people)
Mira Costa High School alumni
1960s births
Hispanic and Latino American women journalists
Latino conservatism in the United States